Bay Shore Hose Company No. 1 Firehouse, also known as Second Avenue Fire House, is a historic fire station located at Bay Shore in Suffolk County, New York.  It was built in 1886 or 1887 and is a -story, wood-frame structure with a prominent bell tower.  It features a slender hose-drying tower at the rear.  Throughout its history it has been used as a fire station, synagogue, and boarding house. Today, it survives as an art gallery.

It was added to the National Register of Historic Places in 2001.

References

Fire stations completed in 1887
Government buildings completed in 1887
Towers completed in 1887
Fire stations on the National Register of Historic Places in New York (state)
Queen Anne architecture in New York (state)
Buildings and structures in Suffolk County, New York
Defunct fire stations in New York (state)
National Register of Historic Places in Suffolk County, New York